St. George Island is one of the Pribilof Islands off the western coast of the U.S. state of Alaska in the Bering Sea. The island has a land area of 90 km2 (35 sq mi) and a population of about 100 people, all living in its only community, the city of St. George, which encompasses the entire island.  The ZIP Code for Saint George Island is 99591.

The island was discovered by Gavriil Pribylov on June 25, 1786, during a search for the breeding grounds of northern fur seals.  The island is named after Pribylov's ship, the St. George.  St. George Island was the first of the Pribilofs to be discovered.

The island is notable as being the breeding site of over 75% of the known population of red-legged kittiwakes.

In 2016, a new species of beaked whale, Berardius beringiae, was discovered near the island.

St. George Island is considered part of the Bering Sea Volcanic Province.

The sole church on the island is St. George Church, an Eastern Orthodox Church in the Diocese of Alaska of the Orthodox Church in America.

References

External links

St. George Island: Blocks 1043 thru 1068, Census Tract 1, Aleutians West Census Area, Alaska United States Census Bureau

Pribilof Islands
Islands of the Aleutian Islands
Islands of the Bering Sea
Islands of Alaska
Islands of Unorganized Borough, Alaska